The following is a list of banks based and operating in Bhutan.  
Bank of Bhutan
Bhutan National Bank
Royal Monetary Authority of Bhutan
Druk PNB Bank
T Bank Bhutan
Bhutan Development Bank

References 

Bhutan
Banks
Bhutan